Saint Joseph, Indiana may refer to:

 Saint Joseph, Floyd County, Indiana, unincorporated town in United States
 Saint Joseph, Vanderburgh County, Indiana, unincorporated community in United States
St. Joseph County, Indiana, county in United States